The théâtre de Gennevilliers is a French national dramatic center inaugurated on 22 January 1983, 19 years after the arrival of Bernard Sobel at Gennevilliers in the Hauts-de-Seine departement.

In 2007, Bernard Sobel is succeeded by Pascal Rambert as director of the place.

External links 
 Des témoins ordinaires, a play by  performed at the theatre in 2009.
 Official page

Gennevilliers
1983 establishments in France
Hauts-de-Seine